Benjamin Thomas Wyatt (born 4 February 1996) is an English professional footballer who plays as a left back for Torquay United.

Career
After playing youth football with Norwich City and Ipswich Town, and in non-league for Maldon & Tiptree, Wyatt signed a one-year professional contract with Colchester United in May 2016. He moved on loan to Concord Rangers in October 2016. He moved to Braintree Town in August 2017. After playing for St Albans City, he signed for Sutton United in September 2019. He was released by the club upon the expiry of his contract on 30 June 2022.

In July 2022 he signed for Torquay United.

References

1996 births
Living people
English footballers
Norwich City F.C. players
Ipswich Town F.C. players
Maldon & Tiptree F.C. players
Colchester United F.C. players
Concord Rangers F.C. players
Braintree Town F.C. players
St Albans City F.C. players
Sutton United F.C. players
Torquay United F.C. players
Association football fullbacks
National League (English football) players
English Football League players